Xylota rufiseta is a species of hoverfly in the family Syrphidae.

Distribution
Xylota rufiseta lives in Myanmar.

References

Eristalinae
Insects described in 1982
Diptera of Asia